Cachorro or Bear Cub is a 2004 Spanish comedy-drama film co-written and directed by Miguel Albaladejo.

Cachorro may also refer to:
 Cachorro (wrestler), ring name of a Mexican masked professional wrestler
 Cachorro Grande, Brazilian rock band
 Cachorro López (born 1956), Argentine record producer, musician and songwriter
 Cachorro Mendoza (born 1955), ring name of a Mexican masked professional wrestler
 Los Cachorros (The Cubs), a 1973 Mexican film

See also
 Cachorro River (disambiguation)